HMS Prince Eugene  was one of eight s built for the Royal Navy in 1915 to conduct shore bombardments during the First World War. The ship was assigned to the Dover Patrol for the duration of the war and provided cover for the Inshore Squadron during the First Ostend Raid. She was sold for scrap in 1921.

Design and description
The Lord Clive design was derived from that of the preceding , modified to suit the smaller and lighter main battery. She displaced  at deep load. To improve stability,  torpedo bulges were incorporated into the hull. Her crew numbered 12 officers and 182 ratings.

Prince Eugene was powered by a pair of four-cylinder triple-expansion steam engines each driving one propeller shaft using steam provided by two coal-burning watertube boilers.

The ships were armed with a pair of BL  Mk VIII guns in a single twin-gun turret; Prince Eugenes turret was taken from the elderly predreadnought battleship .

Construction and career 
Prince Eugene was named after Prince Eugene of Savoy and has been the only ship of the Royal Navy to be named after the general. The ship was laid down on 1 February 1915 at Harland and Wolff's Govan shipyard, launched on 14 July and commissioned on 2 September.

During a refit from December 1918 to March 1918, Prince Eugene was modified to accept a single  gun in a limited-traverse mount aft of her funnel. Delivery of the mounts was slow and the ship had not received hers by the war's end in November 1918. Prince Eugene was decommissioned in early 1919 and was sold for scrap on 9 May 1921. She arrived at Thos. W. Ward's Preston, Lancashire, scrapyard on 10 August 1923 to begin demolition.

Citations

References 
 
 
 
 
 

 

Lord Clive-class monitors
Ships built in Govan
1915 ships
World War I monitors of the United Kingdom
Royal Navy ship names
Ships built by Harland and Wolff